Oil recycling may refer to:

Automotive oil recycling
Vegetable oil recycling